Dr. Frank Cummins (1925–1967) was an Irish hurler who played as a left corner-forward for the Dublin senior team from 1947 until 1948.

Cummins made his first appearance for the team during the 1947 championship and became a regular player for the next two seasons. During that time he won Leinster winner's medal and was captain of the side that lost the All-Ireland final to Waterford in 1948.

At club level Cummins played with the Collegians club in Dublin, winning back-to-back county club championship winners' medals.

References

Teams

1925 births
1967 deaths
UCD hurlers
Dublin inter-county hurlers
Tipperary hurlers